Cotoneaster elegans is a plant species in the genus Cotoneaster found in dense forests (2000–3000 m) in Guizhou and Sichuan, China.

References

elegans
Flora of China
Plants described in 1962